Kamichetty Savithri (born 26 February 1923, date of death unknown) was an Indian politician from Yanam and was first MLA after de facto transfer from that constituency, between 1959 and 1964. She was also former Mayor of Yanam and wife of Kamichetty Sri Parassourama Varaprassada Rao Naidu, who was an undisputed leader until his death in Yanam. Savithri Nagar in Yanam is named after her. Savithri is deceased.

Titles held

See also
Puducherry Legislative Assembly
Bouloussou Soubramaniam Sastroulou
Samatam Krouschnaya
1959 Pondicherry Representative Assembly election

References

1923 births
Year of death missing
People from Yanam
Puducherry politicians
Telugu politicians
French India
French Hindus
French people of Telugu descent
Puducherry MLAs 1963–1964
Mayors of Yanam